Tweedsmuir Park may refer to:

 Tweedsmuir North Provincial Park and Protected Area
 Tweedsmuir South Provincial Park